Pierre Bobot, born Pierre Robert Serge Bobot on 16 February 1902 in Paris and died on 23 August 1974 in Avranches, was a French painter and lacquer artist.

Biography 
Pierre Bobot exhibited at the Salon d'hiver from 1936 to 1950. He was the father of Marie-Thérèse Bobot (1929-2011), curator at the Cernuschi Museum (Musée Cernuschi) and professor at the École du Louvre.

References 

1902 births
1974 deaths
Painters from Paris
20th-century French painters